University of Patanjali is located in Haridwar, Uttarakhand. It was established in 2006 after the Legislative Assembly of Uttarakhand passed The University of Patanjali Act, 2006. It was founded by Baba Ramdev and Acharya Balkrishna

References

External links

Private universities in India
Universities in Uttarakhand
Haridwar district
Educational institutions established in 2006
2006 establishments in Uttarakhand